Brookside Park may refer to:
Brookside Park (Indianapolis), a city park in Indianapolis, Indiana, United States
Brookside Park, Kansas City, a neighborhood in Kansas City, Missouri, United States
Brookside Park, Los Angeles, a neighborhood in Los Angeles, California, United States
Brookside Park, a city park in Ames, Iowa, United States
Brookside Park, a park in Old Brooklyn, Cleveland, Ohio
Brookside Park/Arroyo Terrace, Pasadena, California, a major neighborhood in Pasadena, California, United States